The Evangelical Church in the Republic of Croatia ( or ECRH) is a Lutheran denomination in Croatia. It is a member of the Lutheran World Federation, which it joined in 1951. It is also a member of the Conference of European Churches and the Community of Protestant Churches in Europe. In 2019, there were about 3,600 members.

References

External links 
 
 Lutheran World Federation listing

Lutheran denominations
Lutheran World Federation members
Protestantism in Croatia
Lutheranism in Europe